Eva Lacinová (born 3 October 1971) is a Czech badminton player, born in Prague. She competed in women's singles at the 1992 Summer Olympics in Barcelona.

References

External links

1971 births
Living people
Czech female badminton players
Olympic badminton players of Czechoslovakia
Badminton players at the 1992 Summer Olympics
Sportspeople from Prague